The 2017 Tour de France is the 104th edition of the race, one of cycling's Grand Tours. The 21-stage race takes place from 1 to 23 July 2017, starting in Düsseldorf in Germany and finishing on the Champs-Élysées in Paris. All eighteen Union Cycliste Internationale (UCI) WorldTeams were automatically invited and were obliged to attend the race. Four UCI Professional Continental teams were given wildcard places into the race by the organiser – Amaury Sport Organisation (ASO) – to complete the 22-team peloton. As each team is entitled to enter nine riders, the peloton on the first stage consists of 198 riders from 32 countries.

Teams
As the Tour de France is a UCI World Tour event, all eighteen UCI WorldTeams were invited automatically and obliged to enter a team in the race. Four UCI Professional Continental teams were announced as wildcard teams on 26 January 2017, and thus completing the 22-team peloton. Of these teams,  rode the race for the first time.

Cyclists

By starting number 
The following teams and cyclists took part in the 2017 Tour de France:

By team

By nationality 
The 198 riders that competed in the 2017 Tour de France originated from 32 different countries.

References

External links
 

2017 Tour de France
2017